Gujrat Railway Station (Urdu and ) is located in Gujrat city, Gujrat District of Punjab province, Pakistan. It is an important station in Karachi–Peshawar Railway Line. The railway station serves the city of Gujrat and its surroundings. Almost all the passenger trains that run between Lahore and Rawalpindi make a stop in this station.

See also
 List of railway stations in Pakistan
 Pakistan Railways

References

External links

Railway stations in Gujrat District
Railway stations on Karachi–Peshawar Line (ML 1)